Ugo Vetere (23 April 1924 – 2 April 2013) was an Italian Communist Party politician. He was born in Reggio Calabria. He became mayor of Rome in 1981, after the death of his predecessor and served until 1985. He served in the Chamber of Deputies of Italy in Legislature VI, Legislature VII, Legislature VIII and in the Senate of the Republic in Legislature X.

As mayor of Rome, he signed a "peace treaty" with the mayor of modern Carthage, Chedli Klibi, in 1985 on the 2,131st anniversary of the end of the Punic Wars between ancient Rome and ancient Carthage.

References

1924 births
2013 deaths
People from Reggio Calabria
Italian Communist Party politicians
Democratic Party of the Left politicians
Democrats of the Left politicians
Deputies of Legislature VI of Italy
Deputies of Legislature VII of Italy
Deputies of Legislature VIII of Italy
Senators of Legislature X of Italy
Mayors of Rome
Politicians of Calabria